This Is My Life (La vita) is a 1968 album by Shirley Bassey that was released in Italy on the United Artists label (UA 9035).

Description 
Bassey had started living as a tax exile in 1968, and was not permitted to work in Britain for two years. In 1968 Bassey performed at the Sanremo Music Festival in Italy singing the song "La vita." This song was originally written by Bruno Canfora, with (Italian) lyrics by Antonio Amurri. For the song Bassey sang at the festival, the lyrics were partially rewritten in English by Norman Newell.

Side one of the album included only Italian songs with the exception of "La vita" which is the version with a mix of Italian and English lyrics. Side two is an edited version of the This Is My Life album that was released in Britain and the USA, with the addition of "To Give" which was only included in this album and on a single.
Of the six songs recorded in Italian on this album only "La vita" has had a CD release. It appeared on the 1994 boxset Bassey - The EMI/UA Years 1959 - 1979. While in exile Bassey recorded several songs that were exclusively released in Italy and also performed frequently on Italian television.

In the next step in the evolution of "La vita," Newell wrote English lyrics for the remaining Italian parts and the result was "This Is My Life." This English-only version became one of Bassey's signature songs, often the final encore that she performs in concert.

This album was released in stereo and has identical front cover art to the 1968 UK This Is My Life but has "La vita" under "This Is My Life," and the different songlist.

Track listing 
Side One.
"La vita" (Bruno Canfora, Antonio Amurri, Norman Newell)
"Pronto...sono io" (Vito Pallavicini, Memo Remigi)
"Domani, domani" (Vito Pallavicini, Pino Donaggio) 
"Epirops" (Rossella Conz, Pino Massara)
"Chi si vuol bene come noi..." (Vito Pallavicini, Domenico Modugno)
"E' giorno" (Cristiano Minellono, Tony De Vita)
Side Two.
"Now You Want to Be Loved" (Pierre Barouh, Raymond Lesenechal)
"A Time for Us" (Nino Rota, Larry Kusik, Eddie Snyder)
"Softly as I Leave You"  (Giorgio Calabrese, Tony De Vita, Hal Shaper))
"To Give" (Bob Crewe, Bob Gaudio)
"The Joker" (Leslie Bricusse, Anthony Newley)
"I Must Know" (Neal Hefti, Lil Mattis)

Note: The capitalization of song, film or book titles is different in Italian than in English.

References

External links
http://shirleybassey.wordpress.com/2008/12/14/italian-songs-on-cd/

Shirley Bassey albums
1968 albums
Albums produced by Norman Newell
Albums produced by Dave Pell
United Artists Records albums